Stephen A. Buttle (1 January 1953 – 5 June 2012) was an English professional midfielder who spent six seasons in England, six in the North American Soccer League and at least three in the Major Indoor Soccer League.

Buttle was born in Norwich. In 1971, he began his professional career with Ipswich Town, but never played a first team game before being sent to AFC Bournemouth in 1973. In 1977, Buttle signed with the Seattle Sounders of the North American Soccer League. In the summer of 1981, he rejected an overture from Norwich City to sign him in order to remain with the Sounders. Ironically, the Sounders released him in 1982. By then he had already spent at least one season with the Pittsburgh Spirit in the Major Indoor Soccer League. During the 1979-1980 MISL season, he scored 35 goals in 28 games. Buttle injured his knee at the beginning of the 1984–1985 season. He spent most of the season on injured reserve. On 9 January 1985, the Pittsburgh Spirit hired Buttle as an assistant coach to replace Mickey Cave, the previous assistant who had died in November 1984. In October 1985, the Spirit released Buttle. In September 1986, the Tacoma Stars hired Buttle as an assistant coach. The Stars fired Buttle, along with head coach Alan Hinton, on 22 February 1988. The Stars were sold to new ownership following the season. The new owners rehired Hinton as head coach and in August 1988 brought Buttle back in as assistant. Hinton and Buttle lasted until December 1989 when they were fired permanently. Buttle died on 5 June 2012 at his home in Norwich, England after a long battle with cancer.

References

External links
Buttle career overview
NASL stats

1953 births
2012 deaths
Association football midfielders
English footballers
English expatriate footballers
Major Indoor Soccer League (1978–1992) coaches
Major Indoor Soccer League (1978–1992) players
North American Soccer League (1968–1984) indoor players
North American Soccer League (1968–1984) players
Pittsburgh Spirit players
Seattle Sounders (1974–1983) players
AFC Bournemouth players
Ipswich Town F.C. players
English Football League players
Expatriate soccer players in the United States
Footballers from Norwich
English expatriate sportspeople in the United States
English football managers